The 2008 FIFA Club World Cup was played in Japan from 11 December to 21 December 2008. Each team involved in the competition had to submit a provisional squad of 30 players by 5 November 2008, with the list to be narrowed down to a final squad of 23 players by 27 November.

Adelaide United
Manager:  Aurelio Vidmar

Al Ahly
Manager:  Manuel José

Gamba Osaka
Manager:  Akira Nishino

LDU Quito
Manager:  Edgardo Bauza

Manchester United
Manager:  Alex Ferguson

Pachuca
Manager:  Enrique Meza Enríquez

Waitakere United
Manager:  Chris Milicich

References
General

Specific

Squads
FIFA Club World Cup squads